The men's singles was one of four lawn tennis events on the Tennis at the 1906 Intercalated Games programme. The tournament was played on clay courts at the Athens Lawn Tennis Club.

Frenchman Max Decugis won the gold medal by defeating his compatriot Maurice Germot in four sets.

The silver and bronze medals were awarded on the basis of the best performances against the winner or runner-up instead of the usual losing finalist or winner of a play-off between the losing semi-finalists. Therefore, the bronze medal was awarded to Zdeněk Žemla, who had won a set against silver medalist Maurice Germot in the second round.

Draw

Finals

Top half

Bottom half

References

External links
  ITF, 2008 Olympic Tennis Event Media Guide
 Official results archive (ITF)

Tennis at the 1906 Intercalated Games